Istachatta is an unincorporated community and census-designated place (CDP) in Hernando County, Florida, United States. The population was 116 at the 2010 census, up from 65 at the 2000 census. The name "Istachatta" is derived from a Seminole word meaning "man snake".

Geography
Istachatta is in the northeast corner of Hernando County at  (28.662340, -82.276911). It is on the west bank of the Withlacoochee River.

The town is along the Withlacoochee State Trail, a rail trail that extends north into Citrus and south to Pasco County.

Demographics

As of the census of 2000, there were 65 people, 34 households, and 22 families residing in the CDP. The racial makeup of the CDP was 93.85% White, 4.62% African American, and 1.54% from two or more races. Hispanic or Latino of any race were 3.08% of the population.

There were 34 households, out of which 8.8% had children under the age of 18 living with them, 44.1% were married couples living together, 20.6% had a female householder with no husband present, and 32.4% were non-families. 23.5% of all households were made up of individuals, and 14.7% had someone living alone who was 65 years of age or older. The average household size was 1.91 and the average family size was 2.22.

In the CDP, the population was spread out, with 7.7% under the age of 18, 3.1% from 18 to 24, 9.2% from 25 to 44, 38.5% from 45 to 64, and 41.5% who were 65 years of age or older. The median age was 57 years. For every 100 females, there were 97.0 males. For every 100 females age 18 and over, there were 87.5 males.

The median income for a household in the CDP was $21,250, and the median income for a family was $21,250. Males had a median income of $0 versus $13,750 for females. The per capita income for the CDP was $12,618. There were 33.3% of families and 29.5% of the population living below the poverty line, including 100.0% of under eighteens and none of those over 64.

See also
Lake Townsen Regional Park

References

Gallery

Census-designated places in Hernando County, Florida
Census-designated places in Florida
Unincorporated communities in Hernando County, Florida
Unincorporated communities in Florida